Kannadipuzha River is one of the main tributaries of the  Bharathapuzha River, the second-longest river in Kerala, south India.

The Kannadipuzha (called as Shokanashini ) originates in the foothills of the Anamalai hills in the eastern fringes of Palakkad district of Kerala. It flows through the southern borders of Palakkad town before joining the Bharatapuzha. The Kannadipuzha along with the Kalpathipuzha and Gayatripuzha irrigate a major portion of the Palakkad district which is also called the 'rice bowl' of Kerala. Along the banks of the rivers are Tamil Brahmin villages called Agraharam, where Tamil speaking Brahmins, who had migrated from various Brahmin Agraharams in Tamil Nadu reside keeping their distinctive culture, temple, mode of worship intact. There are many temples in the numerous villages that dot the length and breadth of the river. some of the villages like  "Puthugramam " is having a temple which does not have an idol which, as per spoken history, was removed by the villagers during Tipu Sultan's attack of Palakkad. As per spoken history, the village was established at about 1700 AD by a group of Kandaramanikkam Brahacharanam Brahmins who migrated from Aangarai Agraharam near Lalgudi and Anbil (famous for \Aanbil Brahmarayar Prime Minister of Rajaraja Chola of Chola Dynasty) in Trichi. Initially the village was near the present Manappulli Bhagavathi temple, which at that time was not having any set pooja rituals. These Brahmins codified the rituals, abolished animal sacrifice which was being performed in the temple and made the Bhagavathy  a santha roopini. However, fearing attack and persecution by Tipu sultan, these Brahmins migrated to the other bank of the river Kannadi(Sokanashini) and constructed a new village called "Pudu Gramam". As days passed, the villagers also migrated to other parts of the district as facilities were not available in that area. A group of villagers are now striving to rebuild the temple dedicated to Lore Venkateswara and the consecration will take place in 2018.

Other tributaries of Kannadipuzha
Aliyar 
Uppar

Rivers of Palakkad district
Bharathappuzha